Gabriele Bosisio (born 6 August 1980 in Lecco) is a retired Italian professional road bicycle racer.

On 6 October 2009 it was announced that he had failed a drugs test. On 28 April 2010, it was announced that he would be suspended from professional cycling for 2 years. He was provisionally suspended by the UCI on 6 October, and his ban ended on 5 October 2011.

Major results

2005
7th GP Industria Artigianato e Commercio Carnaghese
8th Overall Bayern-Rundfahrt
2006
8th Milano–Torino
9th GP Costa degli Etruschi
10th Trofeo Laigueglia
10th Trofeo Città di Castelfidardo
2007
1st Giro del Lazio
1st Stage 1 Test Event Beijing 2008
2nd GP Città di Camaiore
4th Overall Circuit de Lorraine
5th GP Nobili Rubinetterie
6th GP Chiasso
7th Giro dell'Appennino
8th Milano–Torino
2008
Giro d'Italia
1st Stage 7
Held  after Stage 14
1st Stage 3 Brixia Tour
1st Giro d'Oro
2nd GP Nobili Rubinetterie
5th Overall Tour of Britain
7th Giro del Veneto
2009
1st Stage 1 (TTT)Settimana Ciclistica Lombarda
2nd Time trial, National Road Championships
2nd GP Industria & Artigianato Larciano
5th GP Nobili Rubinetterie
9th Giro di Toscana
2012
5th Coppa Placci
8th Coppa Agostoni
10th GP Industria e Commercio Artigianato Carnaghese

References

External links 

Palmares on Cycling Base (French) 

1980 births
Living people
Doping cases in cycling
Italian sportspeople in doping cases
Sportspeople from Lecco
Italian male cyclists
Italian Giro d'Italia stage winners
Cyclists from the Province of Lecco